Cute 'n' Country is the second studio album by American country music artist Connie Smith. It was released in October 1965 via RCA Victor Records and contained 12 tracks. Cute 'n' Country contained a mixture of original songs and cover versions by other country artists. Featured on the album was the top ten single "I Can't Remember". Cute 'n' Country was Smith's second album to top the Billboard country LP's chart.

Background 
In 1964, Connie Smith's debut single, "Once a Day", topped the country charts for a record-setting eight weeks. The success jump-started Smith's professional career and launched a series of hits following it. "Once a Day" was included on Smith's debut self-titled album (released in March 1965). The album also included the top five single "Then and Only Then". Smith and her record label were disappointed when "Then and Only Then" did not top the charts. In an effort to find a single that would "eclipse" 1964's "Once a Day", Smith went back into the studio to record her second album Cute 'n' Country. The album was named for a disc jockey who introduced Smith on the air by saying, "Here's cute and country Connie Smith". Smith later remarked that she disliked the title. "Back in Ohio, 'cute' meant bowlegged," she told writer Colin Escott. The cover photo was taken in the front yard of a residential home located in Hendersonville, Tennessee.

Recording and content 
Cute 'n' Country was recorded at RCA Studio B in Nashville, Tennessee between March 17 and May 28, 1965. The sessions were produced by Bob Ferguson. Five of the album's 12 tracks were cover versions of country songs originally made popular by other artists. These songs were Webb Pierce's "Even Tho", Ray Price's "I'll Be There (If You Ever Want Me)", Jim Reeves and Dottie West's "Love Is No Excuse", Jean Shepard's "I Thought of You" and Charlie Walker's "Pick Me Up on Your Way Down". Remaining songs on the album were original recordings. Among these selections were three tracks penned by Bill Anderson, which included the single "I Can't Remember". Producer Bob Ferguson found the track "Senses", which was composed by then-unknown future performers Glen Campbell and Jeannie Seely. Seely later recorded the track herself with Smith singing background vocals on her 2017 release Written in Song.

Release and reception 

Cute 'n' Country was released in March 1965 via RCA Victor Records and was the second studio release of Smith's career. It was originally issued as a vinyl LP, containing six songs on either side of the record. In later years, the project was issued in a digital format via Sony Music Entertainment. In its original issue, Cute 'n' Country spent 30 weeks on Billboard magazine's Country LP's chart. This was similar to that of Smith's debut album, which also spent 30 weeks on the same chart. It also became her second LP to reach the number one spot on the Country LP's survey, holding the position for two weeks in December 1965. The album included Smith's RCA Victor Single "I Can't Remember". It was first issued by the label in April 1965. After 16 weeks, the single peaked at number nine on the Billboard Hot Country Songs chart in July 1965.

In October 1965, Billboard magazine gave Cute 'n' Country a positive response: "The chantress delivers a dozen tunes – some of them really great ones – with a maximum of country flavor and style." The album received a positive reception from Richie Unterberger of AllMusic, who gave the release 4.5 stars. He found the album's Nashville Sound style to be "tasteful" and further commented that "Smith proved herself capable of delivering sorrowful, modified honky tonk".

Track listings

Vinyl version

Digital version

Personnel 
All credits are adapted from the liner notes of Cute 'n' Country.

Musical personnel

 Kenneth Buttrey – drums
 Anita Carter – background vocals
 Floyd Chance – bass
 Ray Edenton – guitar
 Dorothy Dillard – background vocals
 Bobby Dyson – electric bass guitar
 Jan Howard – background vocals
 Ron Huskey – bass
 Anita Kerr – background vocals
 Jimmy Lance – guitar
 Charlie McCoy – bass guitar
 Leonard Miller – drums

 Weldon Myrick – steel guitar
 Louis Nunley – background vocals
 Jerry Reed – guitar
 Hargus "Pig" Robbins – piano
 Hal Rugg – steel guitar
 Connie Smith – lead vocals
 Velma Smith – guitar
 Gordon Stoker – background vocals
 Pete Wade – guitar
 Ray Walker – background vocals
 James Wilkerson – bass guitar
 William Wright – background vocals

Technical personnel
 Bob Ferguson – Producer
 Al Pachucki – Engineer

Chart performance

Release history

References 

1965 albums
Connie Smith albums
RCA Victor albums
Albums produced by Bob Ferguson (music)